Manvel may refer to:

 Manvel, North Dakota, a city in Grand Forks County, North Dakota, United States
 Manvel, Texas, a city in Brazoria County, Texas, United States
 Manvel High School
 Allen Manvel (1837–1893), American politician
 Manvel Badeyan (1957–2022), Armenian politician
 Manvel Ghazaryan (born 1961), Armenian politician